"Time for That" is a song by American rapper Kevin Gates. It was released on September 9, 2016, as the fourth and final single from his debut studio album Islah. It peaked at number 19 on the Bubbling Under Hot 100 Singles on the week ending October 1, 2016.

Music video
The song's accompanying music video premiered on September 9, 2016 on Kevin Gates's YouTube account. Robin Hilton said "The new video from Baton Rouge rapper Kevin Gates is a sultry slow-burner beautifully shot against an arid landscape, with Gates standing amid the ruins of a dusty, burned-out building."

Charts

Certifications

References

External links

Kevin Gates songs
2015 songs
2016 singles
Atlantic Records singles